The Hamilton Group is a Devonian-age geological group in the Appalachian region of the United States. It is present in New York, Pennsylvania, Maryland, Ohio, West Virginia, northwestern Virginia and Ontario, Canada. It is mainly composed of marine shale with some sandstone. There are two main formations encompassed by the group: the Mahantango Formation and the Marcellus Shale. In southwestern Virginia, where the two sub-units are not easily distinguishable, the Hamilton Group is broadly equivalent to the Millboro Shale or Millboro Formation. The group is named for the village of Hamilton, New York. These rocks are the oldest strata of the Devonian gas shale sequence.

Stratigraphic Setting
The Hamilton Group consists of the Mahantango Formation, a gray, dark gray, brown, and olive laminated shale; siltstone; and very fine-grained sandstone or claystone containing marine fossils. The uppermost clay layers of the Mahantango Formation are particularly rich in fossils. It overlies the Marcellus Shale, a fissile gray-black to black, thinly laminated, pyritic, carbonaceous thin shale with sparse marine fauna and siderite concretions. The total thickness of the Hamilton Group in Pennsylvania runs about 970 feet. In New York State, it thickens from 250 feet near Lake Erie to over 2,500 feet in Ulster and Greene counties. Depths ranging from outcrops to 8,000 feet below the surface of Sullivan County, in the southeastern part of the state.

In the interior lowlands of New York, the Hamilton Group contains the Marcellus, Skaneateles, Ludlowville, and Moscow Formations, in ascending order, with the Tully Limestone above. These units are divided by the Stafford, Centerfield, and Tichenor limestones. In Ontario, Canada, the Hamilton Group formations are, in ascending order, Bell, Rockport Quarry, Arkona, Hungry Hollow, Widder, and Ipperwash; the Kettle Point Formation of the late Devonian lies unconformably above.

The Mahantango Formation includes these members in descending order: Tully argillaceous limestone, Sherman Ridge, Montebello sandstone, Fisher Ridge, Dalmatia, and Turkey Ridge. In south-central Pennsylvania, it includes Clearville, Frame, Chaneysville, and Gander Run Members. Its thickness in Maryland ranges from 600 feet in the west, increasing to 1,200 feet in the east, and approximately 1000 feet thick in central Pennsylvania.

The Marcellus Formation contains a local limestone Purcell Member and Tioga Bentonites at the base in eastern Pennsylvania. Its thickness in Maryland ranges from 250 feet in east, increasing to 500 feet in the west, but is only about 70 feet thick in central Pennsylvania.

The Hamilton Group, Tioga Bentonites, and Needmore Shale were formerly called the Romney Formation.

 The Geneseo Shale is a dark grey to black shale that overlies the Tully Limestone; it includes the Filmore beds.
 The Tully Limestone is a shallow-water carbonaceous unit.
 The Moscow Formation (Middle Devonian / Givetian) comprises grey to black shales interbedded with limestones and calcareous mudstones and usually bioturbated.

Age
Relative age dating of the Hamilton places it in the middle and lower Devonian period. In Maryland, it rests conformably atop the Tioga Metabentonite, a thin layer of laminated shale lying over the Needmore Shale. In other regions, the Needmore Shale is replaced by laterally equivalent units such as limestone and shale of the  Onondaga Formation, or chert of the Huntersville Chert.

The Hamilton Group lies conformably below the Brallier Formation (formerly Woodmont Shale, dark laminated shale) at its southern extent. Further north, it is overlain by the Tully Limestone, though some consider the Tully Limestone a subunit of the Mahantango Formation. The Tully Limestone is succeeded by the dark laminated Harrell Shale. In 2012, Read and Erikson reported the group as dating from the Eifelian to Famennian in Virginia.

Economic Resources
The Hamilton is a good source of road material, riprap and building stone, that is used locally for shale aggregate and common fill.

See also
 Geology of Pennsylvania

References

Shale formations of the United States
Claystone
Devonian geology of Pennsylvania
Devonian geology of Virginia
Geologic groups of Pennsylvania
Geologic groups of Virginia
Devonian southern paleotemperate deposits
Devonian West Virginia